Oskar Gottlieb Blarr (born 6 May 1934) is a German composer, organist, church musician and academic teacher.

Career 
Blarr was born in Sandlack near Bartenstein (East Prussia). The Gothic church with its Baroque organ fascinated him early on; he began to form a lifelong love for organs. Blarr and his family fled to West Germany in 1945. He wrote his first compositions at the age of 12. He studied church music from 1952 at the Kirchenmusikschule in Hannover, percussion at the Musikhochschule Hannover, and composition with Heinrich Spitta. He was the church musician of the Neanderkirche in Düsseldorf from 1961 to 1999. He also lectured there at both the Katechetisches Seminar and the Robert Schumann Hochschule from 1984.

Blarr composed four oratorios about the life of Jesus, four symphonies, chamber music and works for organ. He also set many songs of the genre Neues Geistliches Lied to music, some of under the pseudonym Choral Brother Ogo. His organ works were recorded with organists Wolfgang Abendroth and Martin Schmeding. He was a member of the ecumenical Textautoren- und Komponistengruppe der Werkgemeinschaft Musik e.V. and the association Musik in der Ev. Jugend (now: Textautoren- und Komponistengruppe TAKT.

Blarr visited Israel to experience where Jesus lived as a Jew. In 1983, the Israeli composer Josef Tal dedicated his organ work Salva Venia to Blarr, who premiered it the following year in Düsseldorf. In 2016 he was awarded an honorary doctorate by the University of Warmia and Mazury in Olsztyn.

Awards 
 1985  for music
 2006 Compositions prize of Neuss for Tangos und Choräle für Dietrich Bonhoeffer (Tangos and chorales for Dietrich Bonhoeffer), premiered on 15 June 2006 in the Christuskirche Neuss

Selected works 
The German National Library holds four works authored by Blarr, and 168 compositions, as of 2017:

Oratorio 
 Jesus-Passion (1985)
 Jesus-Geburt. Weihnachtsoratorium (1988/91)
 Oster-Oratorium (1996)
 Die Himmelfahrt (2010)

Chamber music 
 Psalm 47, a setting of Psalm 47 for soprano, tenor, choir (ad lib.), trumpet, trombone, percussion (steel drums), violin, harp and double bass (1998)
 Tangos and Chorales für Dietrich Bonhoeffer (2006)
Stadt am Fluß, four short piano works (1. St. Lambertus, 2. Der Neandertaler, 3. Ich denke dein, 4. Karlrobert Kreiten); Edition Gravis, Bad Schwalbach, 1990.

Orchestra 
 Symphony No. 1 "Janusz Korczak en karem concerto" (1985)
 Symphony No. 2 "Jerusalem" (1994)
 Symphony No. 3 "Zum ewigen Frieden" (2004)
 Symphony No. 4 ""Kopernikus" (premiere: Tonhalle Düsseldorf, 7 October 2011)

Organ 
 Sonata Schaallu schlom Jeruschalajim (1 Psalmodie; 2 Rundgang; 3 Tropierter Choral)
 Lischuatcha kiwiti Adonai
 Kenne Sie die Geschichte ... ?
 Schlaflied für Mirjam
 Dream talk (1 Toccata 1; 2 Canon rythmique; 3 Toccata II per l'elevatione; 4 Canon à 6; 5 Toccata III, Final)
 Missa brevis (1 Kyrie "O milder Gott"; 2 Straßburger Gloria)
 Hommage (1 Initium und Organum triplum; 2 Organum aliquotum; 3 Organum accordum and Finalis)
 Handkuß für St. Margaretha
 Al har habajit – auf dem Tempelberg (für great and small organ) (1 Zipporim we Schofar; 2 Epitaph für S.B.C.; 3 Near eastern counterpoint; 4 Magrepha)
 "... qui tollis" – Seufzer für BAZI
 Roncalli-Nashorn Else
 Frühligsstimmen
 Zum ewigen Frieden

Neues Geistliches Lied 
 "Weil du Ja zu mir sagst", text: Christine Heuser, first prize at the second competition of the Evangelische Akademie Tutzing in 1963
 "Shalom, wo die Liebe wohnt", text: Diethard Zils
 "Wer bringt dem Menschen, der blind ist, das Licht", text:

Arrangements 
 Bilder einer Ausstellung (Pictures at an Exhibition) after Mussorgsky, for organ (1976)
 Stravinsky on the organ (1978)

References

Further reading 
 Jutta Scholl (ed.): Der Komponist Oskar Gottlieb Blarr. Eine Dokumentation. Musikbibliothek, Düsseldorf 1994.
 Thomas Schmidt: Die Jesus-Passion (1985) von Oskar Gottlieb Blarr. Eine Synthese aus westeuropäischen und israelitischen Traditionen, Gießen 1987.

External links 
 

Sacred music composers
German classical composers
German male classical composers
German classical organists
German male organists
1934 births
Living people
People from Bartoszyce County
People from East Prussia
21st-century organists
21st-century German male musicians
Male classical organists